Carpenter was a settlement in Grant County, New Mexico. It was located on the west slope of the Mimbres Mountains, but its exact location is not now known. The site was reported to be a small lead-mining camp established around 1882, and was named because many of the prospectors were carpenters by trade before coming to the mine.

References

History of Grant County, New Mexico
Ghost towns in New Mexico
Geography of Grant County, New Mexico